David Garrick (1717–1779) was a British actor, playwright, theatre manager and producer.

David Garrick may also refer to:

David Garrick (play), 1864 play by Thomas William Robertson
David Garrick (singer) (1945–2013), best known for his 1966 pop hit Dear Mrs. Applebee
David Byron (1947–1985), British lead vocalist of Uriah Heep fame, whose original surname was Garrick
David Garrick (1913 film), a silent film based on the 1864 play
David Garrick (1916 film)
David Garrick (1922 film)

Garrick, David